John Hogg (born 1949) is an Australian politician.

John Hogg may also refer to:

John Hogg (biologist) (1800–1869), English biologist
John Hogg, English Catholic martyr, see Richard Hill, Richard Holiday and John Hogg
John Hogg, vocalist for the rock bands Moke and The Magpie Salute
Jack Hogg (John Hogg, 1881–1944), English footballer
John Hogg (footballer, born 1879) (1879–?), Scottish footballer
Jack Hogg (footballer, born 1931) (John Hogg, 1931–2001), English footballer
John Hogg (cricketer) (1818–1885), English cricketer